Gedela Ananda Rao (died 6 May 2021), usually known as G. Anand or Swaramadhuri, was an Indian Telugu playback singer. His troupe 'Swara Madhuri' performed all over the world. He gave more than 6500 performances.

Early life and career
Anand was born in Tulagam village in Srikakulam district. He learnt music from his father who was a stage drama artist. His father along with him would act in Mythological dramas. When his father played the role of Rama, he and his brother played Lava and Kusa. He began his singing career singing songs in many festivals and functions in his neighborhood villages. Anand participated in many competitions and won many prizes. On one such occasion the judges were famous music director Sri. K. V. Mahadevan and singer S. P. Balasubrahmanyam who declared him as the winner. After the show was over Sri. K. V. Mahadevan guru promised to give him a chance in cinema.

Discography

He was given an opportunity to sing chorus in pandanti kaapuram (Telugu: పండంటి కాపురం) in 1972.

  1972: Pandanti kaapuram (Telugu:పండంటి కాపురం)
  1976: America Ammayi (Telugu:అమెరికా అమ్మాయి)
  1977: Ame katha (Telugu:ఆమె కథ)
  1977: Kalpana (Telugu:కల్పన)
  1977: Dana veera Sura Karna (Telugu:దాన వీర శూర కర్ణ)
  1977: Chakradhari (Telugu:చక్రధారి)
  1977: Bangarakka (Telugu:బంగారక్క)
  1978: mana Uri pandavulu (Telugu:మన ఊరి పాండవులు)
  1978: Pranam khareedu (Telugu:ప్రాణం ఖరీదు)
  1979: Tayaramma Bangarayya (Telugu:తాయారమ్మ బంగారయ్య)
  1987: Gandhinagar rendava veedhi (Teluguvగాంధీనగర్ రెండవ వీధి)-music director
  1987: Swatanthryaniki Upiri poyyandi (Telugu:స్వాతంత్ర్యానికి ఊపిరి పొయ్యండి) music director
  1990: Rangavalli (Telugu:రంగవల్లి) music director

Career
After his first performance, he stayed at Madras in the house of the late Leelaraani. After some time he moved in with Medisetty Apparao and Sarathbabu. After listening to his song at a function of actor Chandramohan, Sri Navatha Krishnamraju introduced him to Venkatesh. After listening to his song, Venkatesh promised to get him an offer to sing. They sent him to get fetch lyrics from Devulapalli Krishna Sastry. After a week Devulapalli liked his voice and wrote a recommendation letter to K. V. Mahadevan. He finally got a chance to sing a song 'Oka venuvu vinipinchenu' in the movie America Ammayi.

Death 
Anand died, aged 67, from COVID-19.

References

1954 births
2021 deaths
Indian male playback singers
Singers from Andhra Pradesh
People from Srikakulam district
Telugu playback singers
Film musicians from Andhra Pradesh
People from Uttarandhra
20th-century Indian male singers
20th-century Indian singers
Deaths from the COVID-19 pandemic in India